Dectocera is a genus of snout moths. It was described by Ragonot in 1887, and contains the species D. pseudolimbella. It is found in Croatia.

The wingspan is about 17 mm.

References

Phycitini
Monotypic moth genera
Moths of Europe
Pyralidae genera
Taxa named by Émile Louis Ragonot